Barger may refer to:

As a last name:
Amy Barger (born 1971), an American astronomer
Carl Barger, Baseball executive
Christine Barger, an American actress
Cy Barger, baseball player
Frank Barger, an American high school football coach
George Barger (1878-1939), a British chemist
Jorn Barger, an American blogger
Kathryn Barger, an American politician
Mary Elizabeth Ryan "Toots" Barger (1913—1998), American duckpin bowler 
Ralph H. Barger (1923-2002), an American politician
Sonny Barger, Hells Angel
Thomas Barger (1909-1986), an American geologist
Vernon Barger (born 1938), an American theoretical physicists
Maud Barger-Wallach, an American female tennis player

Also:
Barger-Oosterveld
Barger-Compascuum
Barger-Erfscheidenveen
Barger-Oosterveen
R v Barger

See also
Bargeres